Shahrbaz (also Romanized as Shahrbāz) is a village in Hesar-e Valiyeasr Rural District, Central District, Avaj County, Qazvin Province, Iran. At the 2006 census, its population was 101, in 21 families.

References 

Populated places in Avaj County